James Aaron Watson (born August 20, 1977) is an American country music singer and songwriter. Active since 1999, Watson has recorded several independent albums in his career. His 2015 album The Underdog reached No. 1 on Top Country Albums that year, and in 2017, Watson had his first major radio airplay hit with "Outta Style", which reached top 10 on Country Airplay.

Biography
Watson was born in Amarillo, Texas, and graduated from Randall High School. He then attended Lubbock Christian University and Abilene Christian University, where he began learning guitar, after playing junior college baseball in New Mexico. Watson's earliest musical influences were the classic country records by George Jones, Merle Haggard, and Willie Nelson his parents listened to, and the gospel hymns he sang with his family in church.

Musical career
He released his first album, Aaron Watson – Singers and Songwriters in 1999 and followed that up with Texas Cafe in 2000. It was not until this third album, Shut Up And Dance, in 2002, that Watson gained radio airplay and attention nationwide. Following that record's success, he released The Honky Tonk Kid, produced by Ray Benson and featuring Willie Nelson on guest vocals.

He worked various gigs around Texas before releasing his second album, A Texas Cafe. The follow-up, Shut Up And Dance, was a regional sales success. His 2004 album, The Honky Tonk Kid, was produced by Ray Benson and features an appearance by Willie Nelson. Watson's band is called the Orphans of the Brazos; they appear on his 2005 album, Live at the Texas Hall of Fame. In 2006, his San Angelo release hit No. 60 on the US Billboard country charts and No. 50 on its Heatseekers chart.

On March 20, 2007, Watson released his seventh studio album, a collection of gospel songs entitled Barbed Wire Halo, which includes readings by Billy Joe Shaver. On April 1, 2008, Watson's eighth album, Angels & Outlaws, reached No. 4 on the US Billboard Heatseekers chart, No. 28 on its Country Albums chart, and landed in the Billboard 200. The album's debut single, "Hearts Are Breaking Across Texas", reached the No. 1 spot on the Texas Music Chart. "Love Makin' Song" was released later that year, and "Rollercoaster Ride" followed in 2009.

On September 15, 2009, Watson released Aaron Watson LIVE: Deep in the Heart of Texas, a dual disc CD/DVD set recorded live at the Hog Creek Ice House in Waco, Texas on June 27, 2009.

On July 7, 2009, Watson performed at the 81st Texas FFA Convention in Dallas, Texas.

Watson's 10th studio album, The Road & The Rodeo, was released in October 2010. This was his first record released under the independent record label, Big Label Records. The album peaked at No. 25 on the US Billboard Country Albums chart and reached No. 4 on the US Billboard Heatseeksers chart.

October 9, 2012, Aaron Watson released Real Good Time. It achieved national attention, and was the best performing album for Watson to date, peaking at No. 9 on the US Billboard Country Albums. It was also his first to break into the top twenty for independent albums. It had sold 32,000 copies as of February 2015.

In 2014, Aaron Watson released "That Look,"  which served as the lead-off single from his album The Underdog,  which was released on February 17, 2015. The single debuted in the top 10 of the Billboard Country Digital Songs chart and went on to become one of the most successful-selling independent singles by the end of December 2014. The Underdog made him the first independent male artist to debut at Number One on the Billboard Top Country Albums chart with a self-released and independently-distributed and promoted album. The record sold more than 26,000 units in the first week.

Watson's eleventh studio album Vaquero was released on February 24, 2017. Its lead single, "Outta Style," was his first top 10 hit on the Billboard Country Airplay chart. That single went on to win a BMI Awards for most radio airplay in 2017 and a BMI Millionaire Award. "Run Wild Horses" was released as the album's second single and was a minor top 40 hit on the Country Airplay chart.

In 2018, he released his first live record in ten years Live at the World's Biggest Rodeo Show on August 24, 2018 followed later that year by his first Christmas project, An Aaron Watson Family Christmas, which was released on October 5, 2018 and featured his wife and kids.

In 2019, Watson made a further play for national commercial success. On June 21, 2019 he independently released “Red Bandana”, a 20-song album which received mixed reviews from his fans. Its lead-off single, "Kiss That Girl Goodbye," was released on February 4, 2019. "Country Radio" followed as the second single in September 2019.

Discography

Albums

Singles

Music videos

References

American country singer-songwriters
Singer-songwriters from Texas
Musicians from Amarillo, Texas
Abilene Christian University alumni
Living people
Country musicians from Texas
1977 births
21st-century American singers
Thirty Tigers artists